BC Dynamo Saint Petersburg was a Russian professional basketball club based in Saint Petersburg, that existed for two seasons. The club was founded in 2004 and dissolved in 2006. In the 2004–05 season, the club won the FIBA Europe League.

History

2004–05 season
Dynamo Saint Petersburg was created during the 2004 summer when Vladimir Rodionov, owner of Avtodor Saratov, transferred Saratov's place in the first-tier Russian Super League to the club, along with some of its best players such as Vladimir Veremeenko.
The club - which had the aim of entering the Super League top four and qualifying for European competitions such as the ULEB Cup and EuroLeague - recruited coach David Blatt and players like Kelly McCarty, Ed Cota, Ognjen Aškrabić, Jón Stefansson and David Bluthenthal (who left after two months).
It finished the European third-tier 2004–05 FIBA Europe League unbeaten to win the competition after downing BC Kyiv in the final with 24 points from Final Four MVP McCarty.
Domestically the club, at one point second in the league, finished fifth in the regular season before losing in the playoff quarterfinals to BC Khimki, a team they had beaten in the Europe League semifinal.

2005–06 season
The 2005–06 season saw a roster overhaul as Blatt left for Italians Benetton Treviso, Fotis Katsikaris was brought in to replace him and Cota and Stefánsson were substituted by Jerry McCullough, Damir Miljković and veteran Darryl Middleton.

Defending their title in the FIBA EuroCup (the renamed FIBA Europe League), Dynamo was on the brink of elimination at the second group stage after three defeats in four games.
But the Russians rallied to first beat CEZ ČNymburk and then Fenerbahçe by the 3 points needed to squeeze through to the quarterfinals on overall points difference. In the quarterfinals, they easily swept Maroussi thanks to McCarthy's good form to reach the Final Four again.
They could not repeat the previous year's achievement however as they lost their semifinal rematch to Khimki before falling to BC Kiev in the third place game.

In the Russian Super League, Dynamo beat holders CSKA Moscow 62–61 in January, and rivals Khimki 81–69 in March, on their way to the second place in the regular season but were again foiled by Khimki in the playoffs, at the semifinals stage.

Dissolution in 2006
The club started preparations for the 2006–07 season, nominating Yuri Selikhov as coach to replace the departing Fotios Katsikaris, and registering for the ULEB Cup, but it unexpectedly withdrew from all competitions and folded on 6 October 2006.
Despite announcing a budget of $6 million for 2005–06, Dynamo and its president reportedly made the decision after the city authorities stopped funding the club to the tune of more than $5 million (wanting a merger with Spartak Saint Petersburg). With their other major sponsor (one of the largest banks in Russia) poised to follow, the club used the bankruptcy to get out of its onerous player contracts.

Season by season

Honours
FIBA Europe League
Champions (1): 2004–05

Notable players

2006
  Eddie Gill preseason: '06
  Goran Jeretin preseason: '06
  Maciej Lampe preseason: '06

2005
  Darryl Middleton 1 season: '05–'06
  Jerry McCullough 1 season: '05–'06
  Grigorij Khizhnyak 1 season: '05–'06
  Victor Keyru 1 season: '05–'06

2004
  Kelly McCarty 2 seasons: '04–'06
  Vladimir Veremeenko 2 seasons: '04–'06
  Ognjen Aškrabić 2 seasons: '04–'06
  Jón Arnór Stefánsson 1 season: '04–'05
  Ed Cota 1 season: '04–'05
  David Bluthenthal 1/2 season: '04

Head coaches
 David Blatt 1 season: '04–'05
 Fotios Katsikaris 1 season: '05–'06
 Yuri Selikhov preseason: '06

Notes

References

External links
Eurobasket.com profile

2004 establishments in Russia
Basketball teams established in 2004
2006 disestablishments in Russia
Defunct basketball teams in Russia
Defunct basketball teams
Sports clubs in Saint Petersburg
Basketball teams disestablished in 2006